Reinhold Kesküll (26 November 1900 – 1942) was an Estonian sprinter. He competed in the men's 100 metres, 200 metres and the 400 metres events at the 1924 Summer Olympics. He died in a Soviet prison camp during World War II.

References

1900 births
1942 deaths
People from Kingisepp
People from Yamburgsky Uyezd
Athletes (track and field) at the 1924 Summer Olympics
Estonian male sprinters
Olympic athletes of Estonia
Date of death missing
Estonian people who died in Soviet detention